Robert Schneider (born 1971) is an American pop/rock musician.

Robert Schneider may also refer to:

Robert Schneider (writer) (born 1961), Austrian writer
Robert Schneider (cyclist) (born 1944), American cyclist
Robert Schneider (painter) (1809–1885), German portrait painter
Bob Schneider (children's music) (born 1955), Canadian musician, lead singer of Bob Schneider and the Rainbow Kids
Bob Schneider (born 1965), American musician, former lead singer of Ugly Americans
Rob Schneider (born 1963), American actor and comedian

See also
Schneider (surname)
Robert von Schneider (1854–1909), Austrian classical archaeologist